The following is a list of famous scholars, practitioners, alumni and others affiliated with the storied University of Turin, Faculty of Law:

Notable alumni and former academics
Luigi Einaudi
Norberto Bobbio
Piero Gobetti
Enrico di Robilant
Vladimiro Zagrebelsky, European Court of Human Rights Judge
Anna di Robilant, alum and law professor at Boston University School of Law
Fernanda Nicola, professor of law at American University, Washington College of Law
Kakai Kissinger (1975–), UNITO law alum, is a Kenyan human rights activist and attorney.

Twentieth century
Pitigrilli, pseudonym for Dino Segre (1893–1975) (UNITO Law, class of 1916), an Italian writer.
Mario Einaudi (1905–1994), law faculty alum and chair of Cornell University Government Department from 1951 to 1956 and again from 1959 to 1963.
Luciana Frassati Gawronska (1902–2007), was an Italian writer and author.
Gustavo Rol (1903–1994), noted parapsychologist.
Fernando de Rosa (1908–1936), a former UNITO Law student who attempted to assassinate Umberto II of Italy in Brussels on 24 October 1929.
Giovanni Palatucci (1909–1945) was an Italian police official who saved thousands of Jews from being deported to Nazi extermination camps.
Raf Vallone (1916–2002), law faculty alum and famous Italian actor.

Nineteenth century
Clemente Solaro, Count La Margherita (1792–1869), a famous Piedmontese statesman.
Bartolomeo Gastaldi (1818–1879), a law faculty alum who went on to become a famous Italian geologist and palæontologist, and one of the founders of the Club Alpino Italiano.
Giuseppe Giacosa (1847–1906), law faculty alum, was a famous Italian poet, playwright and librettist.
Lidia Poët (born 1855 in Pinerolo, Piedmont) was the first modern female Italian advocate. Her disbarring led to a movement to allow women to practice law and hold public office in Italy.

Eighteenth century
Carbo Sebastiano Berardi (1719–1768), famous canon law scholar.

Notable current academics
Gianmaria Ajani
Roberto Caranta
Raffaele Caterina
Sergio Chiarloni
Mario Dogliani
Fausto Goria
Michele Graziadei
Edoardo Greppi
Enrico Grosso
Ugo Mattei
Pier Giuseppe Monateri
Paolo Montalenti
Ugo Pagallo
Marco Ricolfi
Rodolfo Sacco
Gustavo Zagrebelsky

See also
Guglielmo Gulotta, Professor of Juridical Psychology at the University of Turin, Faculty of Psychology, and a criminal barrister of the Milan Court.

Faculty of Law
Law schools in Italy
Turin University
University